"Unforgetful You" is a song written and performed by Jars of Clay. It was the first mainstream and Christian radio single from their 1999 studio album, If I Left the Zoo. As the track was produced by Dennis Herring, many similarities in the sound and production styles are noticed with tracks from the Counting Crows' album, This Desert Life, which was also produced by Herring. "Unforgetful You" was featured on the soundtrack to the Melissa Joan Hart motion picture, Drive Me Crazy. The music video for the track features snippets from the movie. "Unforgetful You" was featuring by the compilation album WOW Hits 2001 and the 2008 greatest hits album Jars of Clay: Greatest Hits.

Track listing
All versions of the song written by Charlie Lowell, Dan Haseltine, Matt Odmark, & Stephen Mason, unless otherwise noted.

Christian radio promo
"Unforgetful You" (Radio Edit) - 3:20
"Unforgetful You" (Album Version) - 3:26
0:60 Radio Spot
0:30 Radio Spot

Mainstream radio promo
"Unforgetful You" (Cold Start) - 3:20
"Unforgetful You" - 3:26

Exclusive preview single
"Unforgetful You" - 3:26

Australian commercial single
"Unforgetful You" - 3:20
"Liquid" (Live) - 3:32
"God Only Knows" (Live) - 3:30

Charts
 No. 40 Billboard Adult Top 40
 No. 1 Christian CHR
 No. 3 Christian Rock

External links
Official music video on YouTube

Jars of Clay songs
1999 singles
Songs written by Dan Haseltine
Songs written by Charlie Lowell
Songs written by Stephen Mason (musician)
Songs written by Matt Odmark
1999 songs
Essential Records (Christian) singles